Escort Group B7 was a British formation of the Royal Navy which saw action during the Second World War; principally in the Battle of the Atlantic.

Formation
Escort Group B7 was one of seven such British naval groups which served with the Mid-Ocean Escort Force (MOEF). It provided convoy protection in the most dangerous midsection of the North Atlantic route. The MOEF was originally to be five American, five British and four Canadian groups. B7 was formed in the spring of 1942, following the inability of the USN to form groups A-4 and A-5 due to other commitments. To replace them, two new escort groups, B6 and B7, were formed.

Service history

.
These were joined later by the destroyers HMS Chesterfield and Ripley.

B7's first convoys, in the spring of 1942, were uneventful, and as the pace of the Battle of the Atlantic hotted up in the summer and autumn, the group's charges were escorted without loss. But in December, while escorting ON 153, the convoy came under attack, and three ships were sunk. During this action, on 11 December, Firedrake was torpedoed by the U-boat  and sank with the loss of 168 of her crew, including her current commander, and the group's Senior Officer – Escort (SOE), Commander Eric Tilden. Initially 35 survived the torpedoing, but only 27 managed to get on board Sunflower, which was under the command of Captain John Treasure Jones.

After several convoys had been escorted without loss, B7 covered HX 231 in April 1943. This came under attack by the Lowenherz U-boat group, which sank six ships, but saw two submarines destroyed and five damaged. In May 1943, B7 escorted ONS 5, sometimes regarded as the turning point of the Atlantic campaign.
In a week long battle against three U-boat groups, Star, Amstel and later Fink, ONS 5 saw the loss of 13 ships, for the destruction of six U-boats, and the disabling of 7. At least four of these were credited to ships of the B7. Later that month returning with SC 130, B7 saw the destruction of between three and five U-boats (sources vary) for no losses. at least one of these was credited to ships of B7.

A series of uneventful convoys followed, as the U-boat Arm withdrew from the North Atlantic after 'Black May', while Gretton lobbied for a chance for B7 to operate as a Support Group. In October 1943 this was given, as the German U-boat Arm launched its autumn offensive.

B7 was involved in the battles for convoys ONS 20 and ON 206, ON 207 and ON 208, during which period nine U-boats were destroyed. ON 207 saw three U-boats destroyed; one, by ships of B7, another was shared with aircraft.

During this period B7 had steamed 6,700 miles, crossing back and forth across the Atlantic five times. The group members had refuelled at sea on six occasions, and had also re-armed with depth charges at sea.

Following this B7 returned to escort duty on the North Atlantic route, continuing without major incident until the group was disbanded in the summer of 1944 as part of the preparations for Operation Neptune, the naval contribution to the Normandy invasion.

Losses

Ships lost
HMS Firedrake torpedoed and sunk by U-211 escorting convoy ON 153 on 16 December 1942.

U-boats destroyed
 U-192 depth-charged by Pink on 5 May 1943.
U-638 depth-charged by Loosestrife on 5/6 May 1943.
 U-125 rammed by HMS Oribi and finished off with gun-fire by Snowflake on 6 May 1943.
 U-531 depth-charged by Snowflake and hit by Hedgehog (a new type of anti-submarine weapon), from Vidette on 6 May 1943.
 U-381 depth-charged by Snowflake and hit by 'Hedgehog' from Duncan on 19 May 1943.
 U-631 depth-charged by Sunflower on 17 October 1943.
 U-274 attacked by aircraft, hit by 'Hedgehog' from Duncan on 26 October 1943.
 U-282 by Duncan and Vidette on 29 October 1943.

Commanding officers - Senior Officer Escort

Notes

References
Clay Blair : Hitler's U-Boat War Vol II, (1998). 
Peter Gretton : Convoy Escort Commander, (1964). ISBN (none)
Paul Kemp  : U-Boats Destroyed  (1997). 
Axel Neistle : German U-Boat Losses during World War II,  (1998). 
 Rohwer, J. and Hummelchen, G.: Chronology of the War at Sea 1939–1945, (1992). 
Stephen Roskill : The War at Sea 1939–1945,  Vol III, pt I, (1960). ISBN (none)
Capt. John Treasure Jones: Tramp to Queen, (2008).

External links
http://www.uboat.net/allies/warships/ship/4706.html Alisma at uboatnet
http://www.uboat.net/allies/warships/ship/4386.html Firedrake at uboatnet
http://www.naval-history.net/xGM-Chrono-10DD-23F-Firedrake.htm Firedrake at naval history
http://www.hmsfiredrake.co.uk/ Firedrake Association with survivors' accounts
http://www.carlsen.karoo.net/ Sunflower crewman's website describing his 2nd Drafting
http://www.naval-history.net/xGM-Chrono-10DD-18D-Duncan.htm Duncan at naval history

Escort Groups of the Royal Navy in World War II